Janus Guðlaugsson (born 7 October 1955) is an Icelandic former professional football player and football coach. He played for FH Hafnarfjörður from 1975 to 1979. During that period he was a member of the Iceland national football team. He spent six years playing as a professional footballer in the German Bundesliga for SC Fortuna Köln.

He came home again in summer 1985 to play for Fram Reykjavik, and stayed with that club until 1986. He then later returned to FH Hafnarfjörður. Around 1999–2003 he was coach of the Icelandic lower division team Álftanes, and since 2003 he became involved with Haukar, assisting with coaching both professionals and youth players and passing on his football experience.

Academic career 
After his sports career, Janus studied sport education and received a PhD degree from University of Iceland in 2014 with a thesis entitled Multimodal Training Intervention: An Approach to Successful Aging.

References

External links

1955 births
Living people
Janus Gudlaugsson
Janus Gudlaugsson
Janus Gudlaugsson
SC Fortuna Köln players
FC Lugano players
2. Bundesliga players
Janus Gudlaugsson
Janus Gudlaugsson
Association football midfielders
Icelandic expatriate footballers
Icelandic expatriate sportspeople in Germany
Icelandic expatriate sportspeople in Switzerland
Expatriate footballers in Germany
Expatriate footballers in Switzerland